Actinodaphne molochina is a species of plant in the family Lauraceae. It is endemic to Sri Lanka.

References

 http://tropicos.org/Name/17805177?projectid=21
 http://plants.jstor.org/specimen/k000778999

molochina
Endemic flora of Sri Lanka